Hernu is a French surname. Notable people with the surname include:

 Charles Hernu (1923–1990), French politician
 Laurent Hernu (born 1976), French decathlete

See also
 Hern

French-language surnames